Beyrède-Jumet-Camours is a commune in the Hautes-Pyrénées department in southwestern France. It was established on 1 January 2019 by merger of the former communes of Beyrède-Jumet (the seat) and Camous.

See also
Communes of the Hautes-Pyrénées department

References

Communes of Hautes-Pyrénées